The canton of Le Rheu is an administrative division of the Ille-et-Vilaine department, in northwestern France. It was created at the French canton reorganisation which came into effect in March 2015. Its seat is in Le Rheu.

It consists of the following communes: 
 
Bréal-sous-Montfort 
La Chapelle-Thouarault
Chavagne
Cintré
L'Hermitage
Mordelles
Le Rheu
Le Verger
Vezin-le-Coquet

References

Cantons of Ille-et-Vilaine